Grant Quinlan (born December 4, 1998) is a Canadian professional stock car racing driver. He most recently competed part-time in the ARCA Menards Series in 2018 and 2019, driving the No. 30 Ford for Rette Jones Racing. He has also competed with RJR in what is now the ARCA Menards Series East.

Racing career
Quinlan began racing go-karts at age 5, and then raced in the ARCA/CRA Super Series, and his successes racing in that series earned him a part-time ride in the K&N Pro Series East with the new Rette Jones Racing No. 30 team in 2015. His first race was at Columbus Motor Speedway, where he surprisingly finished second in his and the team's debut in the series. Quinlan also started third and led 63 laps in that race. He would run two more races that year, coming at New Hampshire and Richmond. With Dominique Van Wieringen in the No. 30 full-time in 2016, Quinlan drove the team's second car, the No. 29, at Stafford. He made one other start that year, driving the No. 02 for Young's Motorsports at Iowa. He finished 18th in both of his races in 2016. His only start of 2017 came at the road course of New Jersey Motorsports Park, finishing eighth driving the No. 28 for RJR. For 2018, Rette Jones put Quinlan in their ARCA Racing Series car at Daytona. In the race, Quinlan crashed out and finished 37th. On the K&N side, he ran six of the first seven races of the season in the Rette Jones No. 30 with a best finish of fourth at NJMP. For his second ARCA start, Quinlan returned to the same race and team the following year, where he picked up an impressive third place finish. After his strong run at Daytona, Quinlan and RJR returned to run Talladega, where they would finish ninth.

Personal life
Quinlan is from Maidstone, Ontario and graduated from Essex High School in 2016 where he was an honor roll student.

Motorsports career results

NASCAR
(key) (Bold – Pole position awarded by qualifying time. Italics – Pole position earned by points standings or practice time. * – Most laps led.)

K&N Pro Series East

 Season still in progress
 Ineligible for series points

ARCA Menards Series
(key) (Bold – Pole position awarded by qualifying time. Italics – Pole position earned by points standings or practice time. * – Most laps led.)

References

External links
 

1998 births
Living people
Racing drivers from Ontario
Canadian racing drivers
NASCAR drivers
ARCA Menards Series drivers